Cornelius Grover Hicks (February 9, 1898 – September 13, 1930) was an American painter.

Biography

Cornelius was born in Massachusetts and was the first child of Job and Marilla Hicks to reach adulthood. He was a student at Pratt Institute and had showed tremendous talent in the field of art. In the 1920s, he painted two posters for the American Red Cross. He illustrated for several magazines, including Collier's Weekly.

Personal life

Cornelius married Verna Bauer (1906–1995) in 1927 but had no children. He died in 1930 of Tuberculosis at the age of 32. Some of his paintings were passed on to family members, and a few of his works are still owned by relatives of his.

References

Pratt Institute alumni
20th-century American painters
American male painters
1898 births
1930 deaths
20th-century American male artists